Pardon My Clutch is a 1948 short subject directed by Edward Bernds starring American slapstick comedy team The Three Stooges (Moe Howard, Larry Fine and Shemp Howard). It is the 105th entry in the series released by Columbia Pictures starring the comedians, who released 190 shorts for the studio between 1934 and 1959.

Plot
Shemp has been ill with a toothache. The Stooges' friend Claude (Matt McHugh), a self-proclaimed Kevin Trudeau-ish doctor, gives Moe and Larry some specific instructions on how to cure the toothache, which, of course, they misinterpret every which way possible. After finally yanking the troublesome tooth, Claude suggests they take Shemp on a camping trip for a little R&R. Since the Stooges do not own a car, Claude offers to sell them a car that turns out to be a "lemon."

The trio run into a series of mishaps trying to get the car to work, including a flat tire that gets them into trouble with a local gas station attendant (George Lloyd). Finally, things improve via a car collector (Emil Sitka) who wants to buy the clunker at a premium. Claude gets wind of this, quickly gives his money back to the Stooges, and hands it to the collector. Within minutes, two men in white coats from the local insane asylum come to retrieve the supposed car collector, with Claude following right behind.

Cast

Credited
 Moe Howard as Moe
 Larry Fine as Larry
 Shemp Howard as Shemp
 Matt McHugh as Claude A. Quacker

Uncredited
 Alyn Lockwood as Petunia
 Wanda Perry as Narcissus
 Doria Revier as Marigold
 George Lloyd as Service station attendant
 Emil Sitka as Car Collector/The Professor
 Stanley Blystone as 1st sanitarium attendant
 Alfred H. Wilson as 2nd sanitarium attendant

Production notes
Pardon My Clutch was filmed on May 19–21, 1947; it would be remade in 1955 as Wham-Bam-Slam!, using ample stock footage. Both films borrow plot elements from the Laurel and Hardy shorts Perfect Day (1929) and Them Thar Hills (1934).

This is the second of three Stooge shorts with the words "pardon my" in the title. The first was Pardon My Scotch.

Shemp is unable to convince the gas station attendant that the tire he is removing from the tire display actually came off his car and rolled into the gas station by accident. This was a stock routine that had been used in prior comedies. It had been performed by Joe Murphy and Bud Jamison in I'm the Sheriff (1927) and Edgar Kennedy and Charlie Hall in Slightly at Sea (1940).

A different variation of "Three Blind Mice" introductory theme is used in this entry. This version would be used again for Crime on Their Hands and The Ghost Talks.

Quotes
Larry: "You know, fish is great brain food."
Moe: "You know, you should fish for a whale!" *SLAP!*

(As the Three Stooges head out to pack their car:)
Shemp: "Well, fellas, let's get loaded."
Larry: "Hey, you know I don't drink!"

References

External links
 
 
Pardon My Clutch at threestooges.net

1948 films
1948 comedy films
1948 short films
The Three Stooges films
American black-and-white films
Films directed by Edward Bernds
Columbia Pictures short films
American comedy short films
1940s English-language films
1940s American films